Sam "Sammy" Weir (born 1990 in the Gold Coast, Australia) is an Australian endurance athlete. He is known for undertaking some of the Australia's most challenging endurance events in inhospitable terrain.

5x Aust record holder. Fastest 50 mile 2013 in Australia. Youngest to finish C2K 240  km ultra. First to cross PNG on Foot. Winner of the 450 km single stage Ultra Marathon 2015, 81 hrs 41 minutes.

Youngest Australian to row across the Atlantic Ocean during December 2017, Crossing the ocean in 52 days 4 hrs 18 minutes with fellow Australian Dylan Jones.

References

1990 births
Living people
Australian male long-distance runners